This Thing Called Love is a 1929 American romantic comedy pre-Code film directed by Paul L. Stein and starring Edmund Lowe, Constance Bennett, Ruth Taylor, Roscoe Karns, and ZaSu Pitts. Jean Harlow appears in a cameo role as she was not yet famous. The film is based on the play This Thing Called Love, a Comedy in Three Acts, by Edwin J. Burke.

The film was recorded in RCA Photophone and featured a two-color Technicolor sequence. No complete copy survives, only the Technicolor sequence.

Plot
A man returns from a trip to Peru rich and looking for a wife. While still single, he has a real estate agent show him a house or two. The agent invites him to dinner, during which the agent and his wife start bickering, causing the poor fellow to rethink marriage over. He does still want to share his home with someone, however, so he has the agent's sister-in-law move in. Eventually, they fell in love.

Cast
 Edmund Lowe as Robert Collins
 Constance Bennett as Ann Marvin
 Roscoe Karns as Harry Bertrand
 ZaSu Pitts as Clara Bertrand
 Carmelita Geraghty as Alvarez Guerra
 John Roche as DeWitt

See also
List of early color feature films
List of lost films

References

External links
 
 
This Thing Called Love at SilentEra

1929 films
1929 romantic comedy films
1920s color films
1929 lost films
American black-and-white films
American independent films
American romantic comedy films
American films based on plays
Films directed by Paul L. Stein
Lost American films
Transitional sound films
Pathé Exchange films
1920s independent films
1920s American films
Silent romantic comedy films